Ned Caswell (born December 28, 1963) is an American former professional tennis player.

Born in Atlanta, Caswell was a two-time All-American tennis player for Furman University, having arrived there on a basketball scholarship. Competing in both sports, he was the basketball team's assist leader from 1985 to 1986. As a tennis player in 1987 he reached the NCAA singles quarter-finals and was named the Southern Conference MVP.

Caswell featured on the professional tennis tour in the late 1980s and had a career best world ranking of 213. He appeared in the men's doubles main draw of the 1987 US Open, partnering Luke Jensen. At the 1989 Canadian Open, following a win over Daniel Nestor, Caswell was beaten in the second round by John McEnroe, but was able to win a set against the world number five who lost his temper often during the match.

ATP Challenger titles

Doubles: (1)

References

External links
 
 

1963 births
Living people
American male tennis players
Basketball players from Atlanta
Furman Paladins men's basketball players
Furman Paladins men's tennis
College men's tennis players in the United States